Jie lan, gai lan, kai-lan, Chinese broccoli, or Chinese kale (Brassica oleracea var. alboglabra) is a leafy vegetable with thick, flat, glossy blue-green leaves with thick stems, and florets similar to (but much smaller than) broccoli. A Brassica oleracea cultivar, jie lan  is in the group alboglabra (from Latin albus "white" and glabrus "hairless"). When gone to flower, its white blossoms resemble that of its cousin Matthiola incana or Hoary Stock. The flavor is very similar to that of broccoli, but noticeably stronger and slightly more bitter.

Hybrids
Broccolini is a hybrid between broccoli and gai lan.

Cultivation
Gai lan can be sown in late summer for early-winter harvesting. Seedlings planted in autumn will last all winter. As with other brassicas, gai lan is harvested and consumed just as its white flowers start to bloom, as the stems can become woody and tough when the plant bolts.

Uses
Gai lan is eaten widely in Chinese cuisine, common preparations include gai lan stir-fried with ginger and garlic, and boiled or steamed and served with oyster sauce. It is also common in Vietnamese, Burmese and Thai cuisine.

In Americanized Chinese food, gai lan was frequently replaced by broccoli, when gai lan was not available.

See also
 Bok choy
 Choy sum
 Kale
 Rapeseed
 Rapini

References

How To Stir-Fry Chinese Broccoli

External links 
 

Asian vegetables
Brassica oleracea
Burmese cuisine
Cantonese cuisine
Chinese vegetables
Hong Kong cuisine
Leaf vegetables
Thai cuisine
Vietnamese cuisine